San Francesco Xaviero is a Baroque-style Roman Catholic church located on Piazza Ferrari #12 in the historic center of Rimini, Italy. The church, also known as Chiesa del Suffragio rises adjacent to the former convent of the Jesuits (now a civic museum).

The church was built by the Jesuits in a layout that recalls the Roman church of the Gesù; however, construction was interrupted by the suppression of the order in 1773 by Pope Clement XIV. Prominently left unfinished is the external brick facings of the sides and facade. The interior is a single nave and houses works such as:
Adoration by San Francesco Borgia by Pietro Rotari; 1st altar on right.
Glory of St Ignatius Loyola by Pietro Rotari, main altarpiece, depicting the four corners of the world
Main altar in polychrome marble designed by Giovanni Francesco Buonamici
Japanese Jesuit Martyrs by Guido Cagnacci in right presbytery
Annunciation (two canvases) by Tuscan painter in Presbytery
Saint Emygdius protects Rimini (1793) by G. S. Brancaleoni in the left transept
St Nicola and the Souls of Purgatory by unknown 17th-century painter; 1st altar left.
Other canvases are in display in sacristy.

The adjacent convent once was a hospital, then a museum.

References

18th-century Roman Catholic church buildings in Italy
Roman Catholic churches in Rimini